The Roman Catholic Archdiocese of Guiyang/Kweyang is an archdiocese located in the city of Guiyang in China.

History

 October 15, 1696: Established as Apostolic Vicariate of Kweichow from the Apostolic Vicariate of Fujian
 1715: Suppressed to the Apostolic Vicariate of Szechwan
 March 27, 1846: Restored as Apostolic Vicariate of Kweichow from the Apostolic Vicariate of Szechwan
 December 3, 1924: Renamed as Apostolic Vicariate of Guiyang
 April 11, 1946: Promoted as Metropolitan Archdiocese of Guiyang

Leadership
 Vicars Apostolic of Kweichow 貴州 (Roman Rite)
 Bishop Etienne-Raymond Albrand, M.E.P. (August 13, 1846 – April 22, 1853)
 Bishop Louis-Simon Faurie, M.E.P. (1853 – June 21, 1871)
 Bishop François-Eugène Lions, M.E.P. (December 22, 1871 – April 24, 1893)
 Bishop François-Lazare Seguin, M.E.P. (October 21, 1913 – December 3, 1924)
 Vicars Apostolic of Guiyang 貴陽 (Roman Rite)
 Bishop François-Lazare Seguin, M.E.P. (December 3, 1924 – September 11, 1942)
 Bishop Jean Larrart, M.E.P. (later Archbishop) (September 13, 1942 – April 11, 1946)
 Archbishops of Guiyang (Roman rite)
 Archbishop Jean Larrart, M.E.P. (April 11, 1946 – July 14, 1966)
 Archbishop Augustine Hu Daguo (1987-1997)
 Archbishop Anicetus Andrew Wang Chong-yi (1988– September 8, 2014)

Suffragan dioceses
 Nanlong

See also 
 Christianity in Guizhou

Sources
 GCatholic.org
 Catholic Hierarchy
 UCAN Diocese Profile

Roman Catholic dioceses in China
Religious organizations established in 1696
Roman Catholic dioceses and prelatures established in the 17th century
1690s establishments in China
Christianity in Guizhou
Roman Catholic Archdiocese of Guiyang